Again My Life is a 2022 South Korean television series starring Lee Joon-gi, Lee Geung-young, Kim Ji-eun and Jung Sang-hoon. It is based on a web novel of the same title published on KakaoPage, which was also released as a webtoon. It aired from April 8 to May 28, 2022, on SBS TV's Fridays and Saturdays at 22:00 (KST) time slot. It is also available for streaming on Viu in selected regions.

Synopsis
A young prosecutor, who gets killed while trying to take down a powerful politician, is given a chance to start a new life for justice.

Cast

Main
 Lee Joon-gi as Kim Hee-woo
 A resilient and determined prosecutor.
 Lee Geung-young as Cho Tae-sub
 A corrupt politician who runs his own crime cartel.
 Kim Ji-eun as Kim Hee-ah
 The youngest daughter of the chairman of conglomerate Cheonha Group. She is an intelligent and kind-hearted student, who later fell for Hee-woo after befriending him.
 Jung Sang-hoon as Lee Min-soo
 Hee-woo's law school senior and friend. He is a former medical student who first transferred to the arts, then music and finally, to law school.

Supporting

People at the Prosecutors' Office
 Choi Kwang-il as Kim Seok-hoon
 A corrupt prosecutor who is set to become the attorney general, and serves under Tae-sub. He is Han-mi's biological father but treats her coldly and disdainfully.
 Hong Bi-ra as Kim Kyu-ri
 Hee-woo's friend from law school who later becomes his ally against Tae-sub.
 Kim Hyung-mook as Jang Il-hyun
 An ambitious but greedy prosecutor who is Hee-woo's law school senior.
 Na In-gyu as Oh Min-guk
 An investigator.
 Kim Chul-gi as Jeon Seok-gyu
 A chief prosecutor who is demoted for his investigation of the corrupted higher-ups; he later became Hee-woo's ally.
 Kim Young-jo as Ji Seong-ho
 A prosecutor who is Seok-gyu's junior and later becomes one of Hee-woo's trusted allies.
 Kim Jin-woo as Choi Kang-jin
 A prosecutor who is an unscrupulous and corrupt character behind his clean and upright image.
 Lee Kyung-min as Goo Seung-hyuk
 A hot-blooded and passionate prosecutor who is Hee-woo's partner from the training institute, and Kyu-ri's junior.

People around Hee-woo
 Kim Jae-kyung as Kim Han-mi
 A former delinquent and friend of Hee-woo, who eventually becomes a reporter and assists Hee-woo in his fight against corrupt officials. She is Seok-hoon's illegitimate child but is treated coldly by him.
 Park Chul-min as Kim Chan-sung
 Hee-woo's father, who died in an unsolved car accident fifteen years ago in the original timeline.
 Kim Hee-jeong as Lee Mi-ok
 Hee-woo's mother, who died in an unsolved car accident fifteen years ago in the original timeline.
 Ji Chan as Park Sang-man
 A high school student who later became Hee-woo's ally. In the original timeline, Hee-woo helps re-open the case of Sang-man's father, who was wrongfully sent to jail for murder.
 Joo Woo as Kang Sung-jae
 A martial artist.
 Lee Jae-woo as Kang Min-seok
 An upright and righteous lawyer who is the brother of Hee-woo's high school teacher.
 Choi Min as Lee Yeon-seok
 Hee-woo's strong assistant.
 Lee Soon-jae as Woo Yong-soo
 A rich businessman who mentors Hee-woo regarding real estate investments.
 Yoo Dong-geun as Hwang Jin-yong
 An upright and incorruptible congressman who is Tae-sub's political enemy.

People around Tae-sub
 Cha Joo-young as Han Ji-hyun
 Tae-sub's secretary. She is actually a Grim Reaper who, at Hee-woo's death, helps resurrect him and send him back to fifteen years in his past for a second chance to bring Tae-sub to justice once and for all.
 Jeon Kook-hwan as Kim Gun-young
 Hee-ah's father who is the chairman of Cheonha Group.
 Kim Young-hoon as Kim Jin-woo
 Tae-sub's lackey who is loyal to him and is likewise cold-hearted and corrupt.
 Hyun Woo-sung as Dr. K
 A hired assassin who helps Tae-sub to kill any people who get into his way. He was revealed to be Ji-hyun's brother but he has no memory of her as a result of a fire orchestrated by Tae-sub.
 Hyun Bong-sik as Park Dae-ho
 A banker who assists Tae-sub in managing his corruption funds.

Others
 Jeon Seung-bin as Kim Yong-jun
 Gun-young's eldest son and Hee-ah's older brother.
 Moon Jeong-gi as Kim Seong-jun
 Gun-young's youngest son and Hee-ah's younger brother.
 Jo Sung-won as Park Jin-hyuk
 Hee-ah's loyal bodyguard. His real name is Park Jong-hyuk and was a former special agent who continues to use his alias Park Jin-hyuk while working under Hee-ah.

Extended
 Kim Do-kyung as Moon Sung-hwan
 Hee-woo's friend who is an app developer.
 Han Ki-chan as Kim Young-il
 Seok-hoon's son.
 Joo Sae-byeok as Do Ah-jin
 A croupier.
 Park Na-eun as Sung Jin-mi
 Il-hyun's girlfriend who is a famous musician and the chairman of an arts foundation.
 Heo Hyun-do as Lee Joo-suk
 A medical student who was wrongfully accused of murdering his pregnant girlfriend.
 Lee Yeon-doo as Jung Se-yeon
 A lobbyist. 
 Lee Do-gyeom as Park Seung-wan
 Han Dam-hee

Special appearances
 Bae Jong-ok as Chun Ho-ryung
 Chairman of Jiwang Group who plans to build her business and political empire.
 Lee Kyu-han as Lawyer Cha
 A violent and corrupt lawyer who was Chun's ally.

Episodes

Production

Casting
On November 5, 2021, it was announced that actor Lee Kyu-han decided to leave the series due to personal reasons. Later on November 10, it was confirmed that Jung Sang-hoon would replace Lee Kyu-han.

Filming
On December 31, 2021, it was reported that on December 25, one of the supporting actors tested positive for COVID-19. Filming was halted on that day, and all cast members and production staff were immediately tested for the contagion. As there were no additional confirmed cases, Again My Life resumed filming the next day.

On March 4, 2022, Kim Ji-eun's agency confirmed that the actress was diagnosed with COVID-19 on February 27. She was an asymptomatic case, and was scheduled to be released from self-quarantine on March 6.

On April 18, 2022, it was confirmed that actor Lee Joon-gi had contracted COVID-19, and filming was suspended. Filming resumed on April 25 after his recovery.

Original soundtrack

Part 1

Part 2

Part 3

Part 4

Part 5

Part 6

Part 7

Part 8

Viewership

Awards and nominations

Notes

References

External links
  
 
 Again My Life at KakaoPage 
 Again My Life at Kakao Webtoon 
 
 

Korean-language television shows
Seoul Broadcasting System television dramas
Television shows based on South Korean novels
South Korean fantasy television series
South Korean action television series
South Korean time travel television series
Television series set in 2007
Television series set in 2022
Television series about prosecutors
Television series about revenge
Television series by Samhwa Networks
2022 South Korean television series debuts
2022 South Korean television series endings
Television productions suspended due to the COVID-19 pandemic